Social Age encompasses both societal and technological changes succeeding the Information Age. 

It is divergent from the Information Age as it gives more prominence to social factors when adopting and/or extending technology and information. It further broadens the definition of Attention Age because the Social Age focuses on many forms of societal interactions including online relationships, collaboration and sharing.

References

Information Age